The N'Djamena Hebdo is a Chadian newspaper. In the 1990s Chadian government security forces attacked the offices of the paper killing a number of journalists.

References

Politics of Chad
Newspapers published in Chad